High Republic may refer to:

 High Republic of Heldon, a fictional eugenic mutant-killing polity from Lord of the Swastika, a fictional novel in the 1972 Norman Spinrad alternate history novel The Iron Dream.
 Star Wars: The High Republic, a subfranchise of the Star Wars media franchise set in the era of the same name, first introduced in 2020
 The High Republic [philosophy], a construct of faith, society, and politics, under the Christian church, developed in the 18th century by Gregory Skovoroda

See also

 Republic (disambiguation)
 High (disambiguation)

References